The PH-lamp is a term for light fixtures designed by Danish designer and writer Poul Henningsen. The term is sometimes used to refer to any lamp designed by Henningsen or specially Henningsen's three-shade lamp series. The lamps are produced by Louis Poulsen.

Henningsen's lamps are designed with multiple concentric shades to eliminate visual glare, only emitting reflected light, obscuring the light source. Henningsen's sleek, spare lamp was awarded a gold medal at the 1925 International Exhibition of Modern Decorative and Industrial Arts.

Gallery

References

Poul Henningsen
Light fixtures
Lighting brands
Danish furniture
Danish design
Products introduced in 1926
Danish Culture Canon